"Wash It All Off" is a song by You've Got Foetus on Your Breath, written by J. G. Thirlwell. It was released as a single in April 1981 by Self Immolation, pressed in a limited edition of 1,000 discs.

Formats and track listing 
All songs written by J. G. Thirlwell
UK 7" single (WOMB ALL007)
"Wash It All Off"
"333"

Personnel
Adapted from the Wash It All Off liner notes.
 J. G. Thirlwell (as You've Got Foetus on Your Breath) – vocals, instruments, production

Charts

Release history

References

External links
Wash It All Off!/333 at foetus.org

1981 songs
1981 singles
Foetus (band) songs
Songs written by JG Thirlwell
Song recordings produced by JG Thirlwell